Adam George Heilman (May 27, 1886 – August 12, 1943) was an American college football player and coach, college basketball player, college track coach, and medical doctor,. He served as the head football coach at the University of Montana from 1913 to 1914, compiling a record of 9–4–1.

Head coaching record

Football

References

External links
 

1886 births
1943 deaths
American men's basketball players
Franklin & Marshall Diplomats football players
Franklin & Marshall Diplomats men's basketball players
Montana Grizzlies football coaches
Penn Quakers football players
Penn Quakers men's basketball players
College track and field coaches in the United States
People from Lebanon County, Pennsylvania
Players of American football from Pennsylvania
Basketball players from Pennsylvania